Pablo Morillo y Morillo, Count of Cartagena and Marquess of La Puerta, a.k.a. El Pacificador (The Peace Maker) (5 May 1775 – 27 July 1837) was a Spanish general.

Biography  
Morillo was born in Fuentesecas, Zamora, Spain. In 1791 he enlisted in the Real Cuerpo de Marina (Spanish Royal Marine Corps) and participated in the Battle of Trafalgar in which he was wounded and made prisoner by the English in 1805. He also fought against Napoleon Bonaparte in 1808 during the Peninsular War (part of Napoleonic Wars) to defend his mother country Spain against the French invasion. Once the war ended and the Spanish monarchy was restored, King Ferdinand VII of Spain appointed him Expedition Commander and General Captain of the Provinces of Venezuela on 14 August 1814. He set sail with a fleet of 18 warships and 42 cargo ships and disembarked in Carupano and Isla Margarita with the mission to pacify the revolts against the Spanish monarchy in the American colonies. He  travelled to La Guaira, Caracas, Puerto Cabello, Santa Marta and Cartagena de Indias (United Provinces of New Granada) in a military campaign to fight Simon Bolívar's revolutionary armies.

On 22 August 1815 Morillo surrounded the walled city of Cartagena and put it under siege, preventing any supplies from going in until 6 December that year, when the Spanish Royal Army entered the city. With control over Cartagena, Morillo returned to Venezuela to continue the fight against revolutionaries. In June 1820 Morillo, under Royal mandate, ordered that everyone in the colonies obey the Cadiz Constitution and sent delegates to negotiate with Bolivar and his followers. Bolivar and Morillo later met in the Venezuelan town of Santa Ana and signed a six-months' armistice followed by a second one named "War Regularization".

Morillo returned to Spain, was named General Captain of New Castile, and supported the Liberal Constitution during the Liberal Triennium. He prevented a coup against the Constitution in 1822, and fought in 1823 the French invasion under Louis-Antoine, Duke of Angoulême in the north of Spain, where he was defeated.

When King Ferdinand VII restored the absolute regime in 1823 he went to France. A few years later, he returned to Spain and participated in some military operations during the Carlist Wars. He felt ill and went back to France where he died on 27 July 1837, in Barèges.

See also
Spanish reconquest of New Granada
Reconquista (Spanish America)
Royalist (Spanish American Revolution)

References

Bibliography
 Costeloe, Michael P. Response to Revolution: Imperial Spain and the Spanish American Revolutions, 1810-1840. Cambridge: Cambridge University Press, 1986. 
 Earle, Rebecca. Spain and the Independence of Colombia, 1810-1825. Exter: University of Exter Press, 2000. 
 Stoan, Stephen K. Pablo Morillo and Venezuela, 1815-1820. Columbus: Ohio State University Press, 1959.

External links
 National Museum of Colombia - Pablo Morillo

1775 births
1837 deaths
People from the Province of Zamora
People of the Venezuelan War of Independence
Spanish soldiers
Spanish generals
Captains General of Venezuela
Spanish commanders of the Napoleonic Wars